The 2006 Churchill Cup was a rugby union competition played between the second teams of various top tier international rugby nations and the first teams of traditionally less prominent teams, such as Canada and the United States. The 2006 tournament began on June 3 and ended on June 17. The 2006 competition marked the fourth year of the Churchill Cup as well as its expansion from four to six teams. The Cup was contested by Canada, England Saxons, Ireland A, New Zealand Māori, Scotland A, and the United States. New Zealand Māori won the competition.

The Tournament
The teams were split into two pools of three. The Canada pool played in Ontario and consisted of Canada, England Saxons and Scotland A. The America pool played their games in Santa Clara, California, and consisted of the USA, New Zealand Maori and Ireland A.

The winners of the two pools moved on to compete in the overall final; the two runners up competed for the plate and the two teams to finish third in their group competed for the bowl. All of the finals were played in Edmonton.

Pools
Canada Pool:

USA Pool:

Finals
 Fifth Place Final:

 Third Place Final
"

First Place Final

See also
 Churchill Cup

References

External links
 Churchill Cup official site

2006
2006 rugby union tournaments for national teams
International rugby union competitions hosted by Canada
International rugby union competitions hosted by the United States
2005–06 in English rugby union
2005–06 in Irish rugby union
2005–06 in Scottish rugby union
2006 in New Zealand rugby union
2006 in Canadian rugby union
2006 in American rugby union